Temple Israel was erected at 201 West 4th Street in Leadville, Colorado, during the summer of 1884 in less than two months. The Temple Israel building is a rare example of a frontier synagogue.

History 
The small, Carpenter Gothic structure was designed by George E. King and constructed by Robert Murdock for $4,000 on land donated by the silver baron Horace A. W. Tabor.  Dedicated during services for Rosh Hashanah on September 19, 1884, the Reform synagogue served an interesting group of Jewish pioneers.  Typically downtown merchants, they were an active element in the larger community as exemplified by David May, merchant and founder of the May department stores, County treasurer, vice president of the Congregation Israel, and chairman of its building committee.

The congregation splintered in 1892 when the more orthodox members created Knesseth Israel.  Regular services in Temple Israel ceased by 1908 and the building was entirely out of service by 1914.  Steve Malin acquired the building in 1937, stripping it of the steeples and re-roofing it.  He lived with his wife and two daughters in rooms in the back whilst conducting his automobile radiator repair business in the front.  During the Second World War it functioned as a dormitory/boarding house for mine workers and was sold in 1955 to the St. George Episcopal Church across West 4th Street to be their parsonage.  The building returned to private ownership in 1966 and was subsequently converted into a four unit apartment house. The Temple Israel Foundation bought the building in 1992 and, after a fire in 2006, restored the synagogue to its original condition. The Temple Israel building now occasionally hosts services but mainly functions as a museum dedicated to the pioneer Jews of Leadville.

Besides the synagogue building, the Temple Israel Foundation also maintains the Leadville Hebrew Cemetery, to which it gained title in 1993. The cemetery is located outside of Leadville, about 3/4 of a mile from the synagogue. Records show that 132 people were interred in this cemetery from its establishment in 1880 through 1981, though only 5 of those died after 1930. 59 of the original headstones remain, and the Foundation has provided markers for those that are missing. The Foundation opened a section of the cemetery for new interments in 2001 with space for 51 graves, of which 8 were occupied as of 2015. The cemetery is largely maintained through a volunteer effort led by the Denver chapter of B'nai B'rith.

References 

References

External links 
 http://www.jewishleadville.org

Carpenter Gothic synagogues
Carpenter Gothic architecture in Colorado
Gothic Revival architecture in Colorado
Museums in Lake County, Colorado
Buildings and structures in Lake County, Colorado
Synagogues completed in 1884
Historic district contributing properties in Colorado
National Register of Historic Places in Lake County, Colorado
Synagogues on the National Register of Historic Places in Colorado
Jewish museums in the United States
Synagogues preserved as museums
Leadville Historic District
History museums in Colorado